Isleña de Inversiones S.A. de C.V. branded Avianca Honduras was an regional airline based in San Pedro Sula, Honduras. It offered mostly scheduled and chartered passenger flights out of its hub at Ramón Villeda Morales International Airport. It was one of the most successful airlines in the country and in the Central American region, as it was part of Grupo TACA. It was one of the seven nationally branded airlines (Avianca Costa Rica, Avianca Ecuador, etc.) in the Avianca Group of Latin American airlines.

History

The airline was founded as Isleña Airlines in 1981 by Arturo Alvarado Wood in the city of La Ceiba. It began operations on March 31, 1981 with a Cessna 206 between La Ceiba and Roatán. Their central office was formerly located in La Ceiba and its hub at Golosón International Airport.

In 1998, Grupo TACA acquired a 20% stake in the company, and began operating under the TACA Regional banner. In 2014, Isleña was unified with the rest of TACA's subsidiaries into the Avianca Holdings, being renamed Avianca Honduras.

By October 2018, Avianca Honduras had suspended its routes until further notice. In March 2020, the airline retired is remaining aircraft and transferred its operations to Avianca.

Destinations
As of March 2020, Avianca Honduras operated to the following destinations:

Further destinations were served by chartered flights.

Fleet

Throughout is existence as Isleña Airlines, the airline operated the following aircraft:

7 ATR 42-300
6 ATR 42-320
2 ATR 72-600
1 Beechcraft 90
1 Beechcraft 99
1 Boeing 737-200
1 Cessna 206
2 de Havilland Canada DHC-6 Twin Otter
5 Embraer EMB 110 Bandeirante
3 Fokker F27 Friendship
1 Fairchild Hiller FH-227
1 Grumman Gulfstream I
3 Short 360
4 Let L410 Turbolet.

Accidents and incidents
On April 4, 1990, a de Havilland Canada DHC-6 Twin Otter (registered HR-ALH) landed in the water short off the runway at Útila Airport, following a scheduled passenger flight from La Ceiba with 18 passengers on board. The two pilots claimed to have been blinded by the sun, thus misjudging the remaining distance to the runway. All occupants of the aircraft could be saved.

On March 3, 1997, a Let L410 Turbolet (registered HR-IAS) did not gain sufficient height upon take-off from Golosón International Airport for a scheduled flight to Puerto Lempira with 19 passengers on board. Following the retraction of the landing gear, the two pilots had applied a wrong engine power setup, and were forced to bring the aircraft down again in a belly landing, during which it was damaged beyond repair.

See also
List of defunct airlines of Honduras

References

External links

Official website

Airlines of Honduras
Airlines established in 1981
Avianca
San Pedro Sula
Grupo TACA